Doresia Krings (born 13 April 1977) is an Austrian snowboarder.

She won bronze medals at the FIS Snowboarding World Championships 2005 in the parallel giant slalom and parallel slalom events. She won a further bronze medal at the FIS Snowboarding World Championships 2007 in the parallel slalom event.

Krings participated in the 2006 and 2010 Winter Olympics.

References

1977 births
Living people
Austrian female snowboarders
Snowboarders at the 2010 Winter Olympics
Snowboarders at the 2006 Winter Olympics
Olympic snowboarders of Austria